Theo Tran, also known as Pittrounder, is a Vietnamese-American professional poker player.

Early life and education
Tran was born November 4, 1981 in Allentown, Pennsylvania. He learned to play poker by age 13. 

Tran attended and graduated from the University of Pittsburgh, where he received a bachelor's degree in communications and psychology and was a member of the Phi Kappa Theta social fraternity.

Professional gaming career
After graduating from Pitt, Tran moved to Las Vegas, where he began gambling professionally. After accumulating winnings at various tournaments, Tran entered the World Series of Poker in 2007, where he won in excess of $387,000. 

His career winnings, as of 2022, exceed $2.9 million, according to the online gaming site Card Player. Tran ranks 644th globally and 356th all-time in winnings, as of September 2022.

Notes

External links

Theo Tran profile at Card Player
Theo Tran profile at The Hendon Mob 
Theo Tran profile at World Series of Poker

1982 births
Living people
American poker players
Sportspeople from Allentown, Pennsylvania
Vietnamese poker players